Serde may refer to:

 Serde, Tibet
 Serialization and deserialization, in computing